Melvin Ainscow CBE FRSA (born 25 May 1943) is Professor of Education at the University of Manchester. He is also Adjunct Professor at Queensland University of Technology, Australia.

He was educated at Ducie High School, the University of Birmingham (MEd), and the University of East Anglia (PhD, 1995). He worked as a Lecturer at the University of Cambridge from 1985 to 1995, before being appointed Professor of Education at Manchester in 1995. At Manchester he is also co-director of the Centre for Equity in Education. In 2013 he was appointed a specialist adviser to the House of Commons Education Committee.

Professor Ainscow specializes in the areas of equity, inclusion and school improvement.  Between 2007 and 2011 he led the Greater Manchester Challenge a project that involved a partnership between national government, ten local authorities, 1,150 schools and many other stakeholders, and had a government investment of around £50 million.  The decision to invest such a large budget reflected a concern regarding educational standards in the region, particularly amongst children from disadvantaged backgrounds. The approach used in the Challenge built on earlier research carried out by Ainscow and his colleagues at the University of Manchester which suggests that, under appropriate conditions, greater collaboration within schools is a means of fostering improvements; and that collaboration between differently-performing schools can reduce polarization within education systems, to the particular benefit of learners who are performing relatively poorly.  The impact of all of this was significant in respect to improvements in test and examination results and, indeed, the way the education system carries out its business.

Between 2014 and 2017 Mel Ainscow led Schools Challenge Cymru, the Welsh Government’s multi-million pound flagship programme to accelerate the rate of improvement across the country’s schools. His new book, ‘Towards self-improving school systems: lessons from a city challenge’, was published by Routledge in April 2015.  Another book, 'Struggles for equity in education: The selected works of Mel Ainscow', was published in the Routledge World Library of Educationalists series in July, 2015.

He was made a CBE in the 2012 New Year Honours, and is a Fellow of the Royal Society of Arts.

References

1943 births
Living people
Alumni of the University of Birmingham
Alumni of the University of East Anglia
Academics of the University of Cambridge
Academics of the University of Manchester
Commanders of the Order of the British Empire
People educated at Ducie Technical High School for Boys